John-Paul Kelly (born November 15, 1959) is a Canadian former professional ice hockey player. He played 400 games in the National Hockey League for the Los Angeles Kings between 1979 and 1986.

Career statistics

Regular season and playoffs

International

External links

References 

1959 births
Living people
Canadian ice hockey forwards
Houston Apollos players
Los Angeles Kings draft picks
Los Angeles Kings players
Maple Ridge Blazers players
New Westminster Bruins players
Rochester Americans players
Ice hockey people from Edmonton